Morath may refer to

People
Adelheid Morath, a German cross-country mountain biker
Inge Morath (1923–2002), an Austrian-born American photographer
Kurt Morath (born 1984), a rugby union player
Max Morath  (born 1926), an American ragtime pianist, composer, performer, and author
Mike Morath, Commissioner of Education in the Texas Education Agency

Fictional characters
Morath, a character in the Klingon-language opera ’u’
Nicholas Morath, a character in the 2000 novel Kingdom of Shadows

See also
Inge Morath Award
Inge Morath Foundation
Petra Morath-Pusinelli
Pereswetoff-Morath
Surnames from given names